The Garibaldi Theatre is the name of many theatres in Italy, particularly in Sicily:

Garibaldi Theatre (Enna)
Garibaldi Theatre (Modica)
Garibaldi Theatre (Padua)
Garibaldi Theatre (Palermo)
Garibaldi Theatre (Piazza Armerina)
Garibaldi Theatre (Ragusa)
Garibaldi Theatre (Treviso)

Theatres in Sicily